The MAssive Cluster Survey (MACS) compiled and characterized a sample of very X-ray luminous (and thus, by inference, massive), distant clusters of galaxies. The sample comprises 124 spectroscopically confirmed clusters at 0.3 < z < 0.7. Candidates were selected from the ROSAT All-Sky Survey data.

Cluster candidates that are south of declination -40° cannot be observed from Mauna Kea and fit into the Southern MACS (SMACS) extension. They are also being investigated when facilities are available.

History
One of the galaxy clusters, MACS J0647+7015 was found to have gravitationally lensed the most distant galaxy (MACS0647-JD) then ever imaged, in 2012, by CLASH. The first statistical study of X-ray cavities in distant clusters of galaxies was performed by analyzing the Chandra X-ray observations of MACS. Out of 76 clusters representing a sample of the most luminous X-ray clusters, observers found 13 cut and clear cavities and 7 possible cavities. A new radio halo, as well as a relic applicant, were found in MACS, with the help of the Giant Meterwave Radio Telescope and the Karoo Array Telescope-7. The discovered radio halo has a largest linear scale of about 0.9Mpc. X-ray chosen clusters are almost free of projection effects because they are composed of intrinsically massive, gravitationally collapsed systems.

MACS team
The MACS team consists of:
 Harald Ebeling, University of Hawaii, USA
 Alastair Edge, University of Durham, UK
 J. Patrick Henry, University of Hawaii, USA

Survey notation
Objects are labelled as JHHMM.m+DDMM where HHMM+DDMM are the coordinates in the J2000 system. Here H, D, and M refer to hours, degrees, and minutes, respectively, and m refers to tenths of minutes of time.
 HH Hours of right ascension
 MM.m Minutes of right ascension or declination
 DD.d Degrees in declination

Southern MAssive Cluster Survey 

The Southern MAssive Cluster Survey (SMACS) involved the Hubble Space Telescope.

Notable surveyed objects

References

External links

 http://mnras.oxfordjournals.org/content/407/1/83.short
 http://mnras.oxfordjournals.org/content/421/2/1360.short
 http://mnras.oxfordjournals.org/content/458/2/1803.abstract

Astronomical surveys